Pyotr Georgievich Lushev (18 October 1923 – 23 March 1997) was an Army General of the Soviet Army during the Cold War who was the last  Supreme Commander of the Unified Armed Forces of the Warsaw Treaty Organization. Lushev was made a Hero of the Soviet Union on his birthday in 1983.

Early life

Pyotr Georgievich Lushev was born into a peasant family in the village Poboishche Emetsky district of the Arkhangelsk province (now the Kholmogorsky district of the Arkhangelsk region), Russia. A few years later, the family moved to the settlement of the lumber mill named after Lenin (LDK No. 3) within the boundaries of Arkhangelsk. He graduated from secondary school No. 95 in Arkhangelsk

World War II

Immediately after the start of the Great Patriotic War in August 1941, Lushev was drafted into the Red Army. He graduated from the courses as a junior lieutenant. He entered active service in the army in June 1942. He fought on the Volkhov and Leningrad fronts. He commanded an infantry platoon, and from 1944 a rifle company. In 1945 he got promoted to senior adjutant of the battalion. This post now corresponds to chief-of-staff of the battalion.

Lushev participated to the Sinyavin offensive operation in 1942, during which he was wounded, the Leningrad-Novgorod operation, the Baltic operation, and the blockade of the Courland pocket.

Cold War

After the war in 1947, he graduated from the officer training courses. He served as chief of staff of a tank battalion, and then later a commander of a tank battalion. He was a member of the Communist Party of the Soviet Union since 1951. In 1954 he graduated from the Military Academy of Armored Forces named after JV Stalin. In 1954, he commanded a tank regiment, and was later a deputy commander and then a commander of a tank division. In 1966 he graduated from the Military Academy of the General Staff. 

From June 1969 he was first deputy commander, and from November 1971  - commander of the 1st Guards Tank Army in the Group of Soviet Forces in Germany ( Dresden , GDR ). In 1973 he graduated from the Higher Academic Courses at the Military Academy of the General Staff. On July 30, 1973  he was made First Deputy Commander-in-Chief of the Group of Soviet Forces in Germany. In June 1975 was made a commander of the troops of the Volga Military District, colonel-general (February 1976). In December 1977  - commander of the troops of the Central Asian Military District. In November 1980  - commander of the troops of the Moscow Military District. The military rank "army general" was conferred by the Decree of the Presidium of the Supreme Soviet of the USSR of November 2, 1981. In July 1985 he was made the Commander-in-Chief of the Group of Soviet Forces in Germany.

June 1986  - First Deputy Minister of Defense of the USSR . Since January 24, 1989  - Commander-in-Chief of the United Armed Forces of the Warsaw Treaty member states , he was the last military commander to occupy this post. Since April 26, 1991  - military inspector-adviser of the Group of Inspectors General of the Ministry of Defense of the USSR.

Member of the Supreme Soviet of the USSR 10th and 11th convocations (1979–1989). People's Deputy of the USSR in 1989–1991. Member of the CPSU Central Committee in 1981–1990.

Later life and legacy

In 1992 he retired, living in Moscow before his death on 23 March 1997; Lushev is buried in the Novodevichy Cemetery.

In memory of Pyotr Lushev in 2005, a memorial plaque was erected on the building of the secondary school No. 95 in the city of Arkhangelsk, which he graduated from.

References

1923 births
1997 deaths
Soviet military personnel of World War II
Heroes of the Soviet Union
Recipients of the Order of Lenin
Recipients of the Order of the Red Banner
Army generals (Soviet Union)
People from Arkhangelsk Governorate
People from Kholmogorsky District
Military Academy of the General Staff of the Armed Forces of the Soviet Union alumni